Andrej Prean Nagy (8 September 1923 – 5 September 1997) also referred to as André Nagy or Andras Nagy, was a Romanian-born Hungarian footballer and coach. As a player Nagy played for both Ferencváros and Hungary.

Nagy left the country in 1945, and played abroad for Bayern Munich. He then moved to France where he played first with AS Cannes and then Olympique de Marseille and RC Strasbourg. He joined later Spanish team UD Las Palmas on 18 January 1952 where he played till 1955.

Nagy had three stints as coach for Club Africain, Tunis in 1969–71, 1977–81, and 1984–85.

External links and references

 
Profile and career stats
Profile at tempofradi
Profile at om1899
Profile at racingstub

1923 births
1997 deaths
People from Vulcan, Hunedoara
Romanian emigrants to Hungary
Hungarian footballers
Hungary international footballers
Hungarian expatriate footballers
Expatriate footballers in Spain
Hungarian expatriate sportspeople in Spain
Expatriate footballers in France
Hungarian expatriate sportspeople in France
Ferencvárosi TC footballers
FC Bayern Munich footballers
Ligue 1 players
AS Cannes players
Olympique de Marseille players
RC Strasbourg Alsace players
UD Las Palmas players
La Liga players
Association football forwards
Hungarian football managers
Sfax Railways Sports managers
North American Soccer League (1968–1984) coaches
Washington Whips managers
Club Africain football managers
Tunisia national football team managers
JS Kabylie managers
CS Hammam-Lif managers
Tunisian Ligue Professionnelle 1 managers
Hungarian expatriate football managers
Expatriate football managers in Tunisia
Hungarian expatriate sportspeople in Tunisia
Expatriate soccer managers in the United States
Hungarian expatriate sportspeople in the United States
Expatriate football managers in Algeria
Hungarian expatriate sportspeople in Algeria